This article shows the rosters of all participating teams at the 2014 FIVB Volleyball Men's World Championship in Poland.

Pool A

The following is the Polish roster in the 2014 FIVB Volleyball Men's World Championship.

Head coach:  Stéphane Antiga

The following is the Argentine roster in the 2014 FIVB Volleyball Men's World Championship.

Head coach: Julio Velasco

The following is the Serbian roster in the 2014 FIVB Volleyball Men's World Championship.

Head coach:  Igor Kolaković

The following is the Australian roster in the 2014 FIVB Volleyball Men's World Championship.

Head coach:  Jon Uriarte

The following is the Cameroonian roster in the 2014 FIVB Volleyball Men's World Championship.

Head coach:  Peter Nonnenbroich

The following is the Venezuelan roster in the 2014 FIVB Volleyball Men's World Championship.

Head coach:  Vincenzo Nacci

Pool B

The following is the Brazilian roster in the 2014 FIVB Volleyball Men's World Championship.

Head coach: Bernardo Rezende

The following is the Cuban roster in the 2014 FIVB Volleyball Men's World Championship.

Head coach: Rodolfo Sánchez

The following is the German roster in the 2014 FIVB Volleyball Men's World Championship.

Head coach:  Vital Heynen

The following is the Tunisian roster in the 2014 FIVB Volleyball Men's World Championship.

Head coach: Fethi Mkaouar

The following is the South Korean roster in the 2014 FIVB Volleyball Men's World Championship.

Head coach: Park Ki-won

The following is the Finnish roster in the 2014 FIVB Volleyball Men's World Championship.

Head coach: Tuomas Sammelvuo

Pool C

The following is the Russian roster in the 2014 FIVB Volleyball Men's World Championship.

Head coach: Andrey Voronkov

The following is the Bulgarian roster in the 2014 FIVB Volleyball Men's World Championship.

Head coach: Plamen Konstantinov

The following is the Canadian roster in the 2014 FIVB Volleyball Men's World Championship.

Head coach: Glenn Hoag

The following is the Egyptian roster in the 2014 FIVB Volleyball Men's World Championship.

Head coach: Ibrahim Fakheldin

The following is the Chinese roster in the 2014 FIVB Volleyball Men's World Championship.

Head coach: Xie Guochen

The following is the Mexican roster in the 2014 FIVB Volleyball Men's World Championship.

Head coach: Sergio Hernández

Pool D

The following is the Italian roster in the 2014 FIVB Volleyball Men's World Championship.

Head coach: Mauro Berruto

The following is the American roster in the 2014 FIVB Volleyball Men's World Championship.

Head coach: John Speraw

The following is the Iranian roster in the 2014 FIVB Volleyball Men's World Championship.

Head coach:  Slobodan Kovač

The following is the French roster in the 2014 FIVB Volleyball Men's World Championship.

Head coach: Laurent Tillie

The following is the Puerto Rican roster in the 2014 FIVB Volleyball Men's World Championship.

Head coach: David Alemán

The following is the Belgian roster in the 2014 FIVB Volleyball Men's World Championship.

Head coach: Dominique Baeyens

See also
2014 FIVB Volleyball Women's World Championship squads

References

External links
Teams

S
FIVB Volleyball Men's World Championship squads